Popovo is a rural locality (a village) in Kichmegnskoye Rural Settlement, Kichmengsko-Gorodetsky District, Vologda Oblast, Russia. The population was 29 as of 2002.

Geography 
Popovo is located 13 km northeast of Kichmengsky Gorodok (the district's administrative centre) by road. Kropachevo is the nearest rural locality.

References 

Rural localities in Kichmengsko-Gorodetsky District